Patricia A. Holmes (born  1959) is a former member of the Michigan Senate.

Holmes was born around 1959.

Holmes was the daughter of Michigan state senator David S. Holmes Jr. Upon her father's death, she won a special election that allowed her to succeed her father. Holmes served in the Michigan Senate seat that represented the 4th district from November 29, 1994 to December 31, 1994. She did not win the Democratic primary for the same position that same year. During her time in the legislature, she lived in Detroit.

In 2016, Holmes attempted to regain the state senate seat she previously held in a special election. She was defeated in the Democratic primaries on August 2 by Ian Conyers.

References

Living people
1950s births
African-American women in politics
African-American state legislators in Michigan
Women state legislators in Michigan
Democratic Party Michigan state senators
Politicians from Detroit
20th-century American women politicians
20th-century American politicians
20th-century African-American women
Year of birth missing (living people)
21st-century African-American politicians
21st-century American politicians
21st-century African-American women
21st-century American women politicians